Marcus Mason (born June 23, 1984 in Potomac, Maryland) is a former American football running back. He was the all time leading rusher in Maryland history. He was signed by the Washington Redskins as an undrafted free agent in 2007. He played college football at Youngstown State. Mason was also a member of the Baltimore Ravens, New York Jets, and San Diego Chargers.

Early years
Mason starred at Georgetown Preparatory School in Bethesda, Maryland, where he became the all-time leading rusher (5,700 yards) in Maryland high school history.

College career
Mason played college football at the University of Illinois and Youngstown State University.  In two seasons at Youngstown State, Mason compiled 2,739 rushing yards on 478 carries and scored 31 touchdowns.  As a senior, he rushed for a school-record 1,847 yards on 302 carries and had 23 touchdowns.

Professional career

First stint with Redskins
In his first ever preseason game with the Redskins, Mason scored a one-yard rushing touchdown to give the Redskins a 7-6 lead over the Tennessee Titans.  For the whole preseason, Mason compiled 95 yards on 25 carries.  Mason eventually made the 53-man roster in 2007 but was moved to the practice squad shortly after to make room for Omar Stoutmire.

Despite leading the NFL in rushing during the 2008 preseason, Mason was released by the Redskins during final cuts on August 30.

Baltimore Ravens
A day after his release from the Redskins, Mason was signed to the Baltimore Ravens' practice squad on August 31, 2008.  He remained there for the first eight weeks of the season.

New York Jets
Mason was signed to the New York Jets' active roster off the Baltimore Ravens' practice squad on October 29, 2008.  The move came a day after Jets running back Jesse Chatman was placed on season-ending injured reserve.  The Jets waived Mason on December 9.

Mason was re-signed to the practice squad on December 21, 2008.  He was waived by the team the following offseason on April 27, 2009.

Second stint with Redskins
Mason was claimed off waivers by the Washington Redskins on April 28, 2009. On October 20, 2009 the Redskins released Mason. He was re-signed on November 23.

On March 4, 2010, Mason was released by the Redskins.

San Diego Chargers
On March 8, 2010, Mason was claimed off waivers by the San Diego Chargers.
On August 31, 2010, Mason was released by the San Diego Chargers.

External links
Washington Redskins bio
San Diego Chargers bio

1984 births
Living people
Players of American football from Maryland
American football running backs
Illinois Fighting Illini football players
Youngstown State Penguins football players
Washington Redskins players
Baltimore Ravens players
New York Jets players
San Diego Chargers players
Georgetown Preparatory School alumni